Delchev is a Bulgarian masculine surname, its feminine counterpart is Delcheva. It may refer to
 Aleksander Delchev (born 1971), Bulgarian chess grandmaster and chess author
 Aleksandra Delcheva (born 1987), Bulgarian volleyball player
 Gotse Delchev (1872–1903), revolutionary figure in Ottoman-ruled Macedonia
 Gotse Delchev (town) in southwestern Bulgaria
 PFC Pirin Gotse Delchev, a Bulgarian football club, based in Gotse Delchev
 Gotse Delchev Municipality in Bulgaria
 Gotse Delchev, Blagoevgrad Province, a town in Gotse Delchev Municipality
 Delchev Ridge in Antarctica, named after Gotse
 Delchev Peak in Antarctica, named after Gotse
 Ruzha Delcheva (1915–2002), Bulgarian stage and film actress

Bulgarian-language surnames